"Boxing" is a song from Ben Folds Five's 1995 self-titled debut album. It was written by Ben Folds. A live version appears on the 1998 album Naked Baby Photos. The song also appears in a solo version by Folds on the 2005 download-only album iTunes Originals - Ben Folds and in a symphonic version with the West Australian Symphony Orchestra on the 2005 DVD Ben Folds and WASO Live in Perth, and in an a cappella version on Ben Folds Presents: University A Cappella!.

The song was inspired by Ben Folds' father's love of boxing, and is written from the perspective of Muhammad Ali as he considers retiring from the sport. The hypothetical monologue is addressed to Howard Cosell, the famous sports announcer who covered boxing matches of that era.

Bette Midler covered the song on her 1998 album Bathhouse Betty. Jon Foreman of Switchfoot covered the song on a rare cover compilation only found on the internet entitled Songs By Other Folk.

References

Ben Folds Five songs
1995 songs
Songs written by Ben Folds